was a Japanese samurai and commander of the Sengoku period who served the Mōri clan. He was the keeper of Gassantoda castle which was the most important castle of the Mōri clan in the San'in region.

References

Samurai
1503 births
1584 deaths
Mōri clan